Persatuan Sepakbola Indonesia Bangka Barat or Persibabar (English: Football Association of Indonesia West Bangka) is an  Indonesian football club based in Muntok, West Bangka, Bangka Belitung Islands. They compete in Liga 3.

Honours
 Liga 3 Bangka Belitung Islands
 Champion: 2019

References

External links
Liga-Indonesia.co.id

Football clubs in Bangka Belitung Islands
Football clubs in Indonesia
Association football clubs established in 2003
2003 establishments in Indonesia